Hatfield Island is a bar on the Guyandotte River at its confluence with Island Creek in Logan, West Virginia. Hatfield Island is home to Logan High School, and has been home to Logan High School since it was opened to students for the 1957–58 school year.  The island was formerly known as Midelburg Island as it was owned at one point a Logan businessman, Ferdinand Midelburg, who operated a chain of theaters in WV and KY, including the Midelburg Theater on lower Stratton Street.

See also 
List of islands of West Virginia

References

External links 
Logan High School

River islands of West Virginia
Landforms of Logan County, West Virginia
Guyandotte River